Peter Sellars (born September 27, 1957) is an American theatre director, noted for his unique contemporary stagings of classical and contemporary operas and plays. Sellars is professor at the University of California, Los Angeles (UCLA), where he teaches Art as Social Action and Art as Moral Action. He is widely regarded as one of the key figures of theatre and opera of the last 50 years.

Biography

Early and middle career
Sellars was born in Pittsburgh, Pennsylvania, and attended Phillips Academy in Andover, Massachusetts. His classmate Sloane Citron, a future magazine publisher, remembered Sellars as:

Sellars attended Harvard University. As an undergraduate, he performed a puppet version of Wagner's Ring cycle, and directed a minimalist production of Three Sisters. Mature birch trees were placed on the stage apron at Loeb Drama Center and Chopin Nocturnes were played on a concert grand piano that could be seen through a suspended gauze box set.

Sellars's production of Shakespeare's Antony and Cleopatra in the swimming pool of Harvard's Adams House brought press attention well beyond campus. This was also the case with his subsequent techno-industrial production of King Lear, which included a Lincoln Continental on stage and ambient musical moods by Robert Rutman's U.S. Steel Cello Ensemble. In his senior year, Sellars staged a production of Nikolai Gogol's The Inspector-General at the American Repertory Theatre in Cambridge. He graduated from Harvard in 1980.

In the summer of 1980 he staged a production in New Hampshire of Don Giovanni, with the cast, costumed and presented to resemble a blaxploitation film. Don Giovanni partied almost-naked (underwear only) and shooting heroin. The production was performed under the aegis of the Monadnock Music Festival in Manchester, New Hampshire.  Opera News hailed it as "an act of artistic vandalism". In the winter of 1980, Sellars'  production of George Frideric Handel's Orlando, again at the American Repertory Theatre, brought him to national attention. He set the work in outer space. Later, Sellars studied theatre and related arts in Japan, China, and India.

Sellars served as director of the Boston Shakespeare Company for the 1983–1984 season. His productions included an influential Pericles, Prince of Tyre and a staging of The Lighthouse, with music by British composer Peter Maxwell Davies. In 1983 he received a MacArthur Fellowship.

Sellars was the original director of the 1983 Broadway musical My One and Only, a revisal of the George & Ira Gershwin show Funny Face. However, the avant-garde approach of Sellars and librettist Timothy Mayer clashed with the more traditional take of star Tommy Tune, who eventually took over as the director. As Sellars told The New York Times, it was a struggle "between the forces of Brecht and the forces of The Pajama Game."

In 1984, Sellars was named director and manager of the American National Theater  at the Kennedy Center in Washington, D.C. at the age of 26; he held this post until 1986. During his time in Washington, Sellars staged a production of The Count of Monte Cristo, in a version by James O'Neill, featuring Richard Thomas, Patti LuPone, Zakes Mokae, and other noted performers. The production had a set design by George Tsypin, with costumes by Dunya Ramicova, and lighting by James F. Ingalls. He also directed productions of Idiot's Delight by Robert Sherwood, and Sophocles's Ajax, as adapted by Robert Auletta.

Sellars was Artistic Director of the 1990 and 1993 Los Angeles Festivals, presenting works of talented artists such as the late Iranian director Reza Abdoh, and playwright Frank Ambriz.

Sellars produced the three operas by Mozart with libretti by da Ponte, Così fan tutte (set in a diner on Cape Cod), The Marriage of Figaro (set in a luxury apartment in New York City's Trump Tower), and Don Giovanni (set in New York City's Spanish Harlem, cast and costumed as a blaxploitation movie), in collaboration with Emmanuel Music and its Artistic Director, Craig Smith. The productions were met with great critical acclaim, recorded in Austria by ORF in 1989, subsequently televised by PBS, and later revived at MC93 Bobigny (Paris) and the Gran Teatre del Liceu (Barcelona).

Sellars directed one feature film, The Cabinet of Dr. Ramirez, a silent color film starring Joan Cusack, Peter Gallagher, Ron Vawter, and Mikhail Baryshnikov. He co-wrote and was featured in Jean-Luc Godard's film of the Shakespeare play King Lear.

The Salzburg and Glyndebourne Festivals invited Sellars to produce operas, including Olivier Messiaen's Saint François d'Assise, Paul Hindemith's Mathis der Maler, György Ligeti's Le Grand Macabre, John Adams's and Alice Goodman's Nixon in China and The Death of Klinghoffer, and Kaija Saariaho's L'amour de loin.

Sellars also staged Handel's opera Giulio Cesare and oratorio Theodora, and Stravinsky's A Soldier's Tale, with the Los Angeles Philharmonic conducted by Esa-Pekka Salonen, in addition to I Was Looking at the Ceiling and Then I Saw the Sky and The Peony Pavilion.

He directed an important production of The Persians at the Edinburgh Festival in 1993, which presented the play as a response to the Gulf War of 1990–91.

In 1998, Sellars was awarded the Erasmus Prize for his work combining European and American cultural traditions in opera and theatre. In 2001 he was awarded the Harvard Arts Medal. In 2005 Sellars was awarded The Dorothy and Lillian Gish Prize, given annually to "a man or woman who has made an outstanding contribution to the beauty of the world and to mankind's enjoyment and understanding of life."

Sellars has acted in very small roles in TV series, including Miami Vice and The Equalizer.

Recent years

Sellars was the librettist for the opera Doctor Atomic composed by John Adams.

In August 2006, he directed a staged performance of Mozart's unfinished opera Zaide as part of the Mostly Mozart Festival at Lincoln Center in New York. Pre-concert discussions were about contemporary slavery and the prospect of abolishing it, as well as Mozart's egalitarianism and opposition to slavery. In late 2006, Sellars organized the New Crowned Hope Festival in Vienna, Austria as Artistic Director (the festival was part of Vienna Mozart Year 2006). He directed the premieres of Saariaho's oratorio La Passion de Simone and Adams's most recent opera, A Flowering Tree, also in Vienna.

In 2007, Sellars delivered the "State of Cinema" address at the 50th San Francisco International Film Festival on April 29. He introduced the screenings of Mahamat Saleh Haroun's Daratt and Garin Nugroho's Opera Jawa, two of the New Crowned Hope films. The festival also screened Jon Else's documentary, Wonders Are Many, which features an account of Adams's and Sellars's creation of the first San Francisco production of Doctor Atomic. An extensive commentary by Sellars is included in the 2007 DVD of Grigori Kozintsev's King Lear by Facets Video.

In early 2009, Sellars co-curated a contemporary art exhibition of work by Ethiopian artist Elias Simé at the Santa Monica Museum of Art, a kunsthalle in Santa Monica, California. His Othello, starring Philip Seymour Hoffman as Iago, was produced in the Fall 2009 season at New York City's Public Theater.

In 2011, Sellars directed a production of John Adams's opera Nixon in China for New York's Metropolitan Opera. This was broadcast in many theaters around the world in HD on February 12. During a backstage interview in the first intermission, Sellars referred to the fall of President Hosni Mubarak, which took place in Cairo on the previous day, comparing it to the momentous time when President Richard Nixon first met with Mao Tse-tung in Peking, opening diplomatic and trade relations between the United States and the People's Republic of China. In Summer 2011 he directed the opera Griselda at the Santa Fe Opera in Santa Fe, New Mexico.

In 2011, Sellars's work was documented in John Freeman's book, The Greatest Shows on Earth: World Theatre from Peter Brook to the Sydney Olympics. Libri: Oxford. For his collected work in the field of opera and music productions, Sellars was awarded the prestigious Swedish Polar Music Prize of 2014, alongside Chuck Berry.

Sellars wrote the libretto for John Adams's opera Girls of the Golden West.

In 2019 Sellars gave the keynote address at the Salzburg Festival. The speech was entitled “Listening to the Ocean: Planetary Change and Cultural Action – The meaning and urgency of ‘ecological civilization’ in the next generation”.

The address coincided with his staging of Idomeneo by Wolfgang Amadeus Mozart, conducted by Teodor Currentzis.

Classical music critic Mark Swed of the Los Angeles Times wrote of the production "In Idomeneo, "Mozart lets us listen to the ocean, and for Sellars, this becomes a warning that our oceans are again angry. Climate change has altered their form, and plastics have toxified their substance."

Sellars is a professor at the University of California Los Angeles.

Reception
Sellars has been criticized for straying too far from composers' intentions. György Ligeti was deeply upset at Sellars's 1997 production of his Le Grand Macabre at the Salzburg Festival.  Ligeti, however, was present for the majority of the rehearsals and only complained directly to the press a few days before the opening, causing suspicion that he was only courting controversy for publicity purposes. On the other hand, Kaija Saariaho has stated that Sellars's design for the Salzburg and Santa Fe Opera productions of her 2000 opera L'amour de loin was in harmony with her imagination of the set. Sellars again worked with Saariaho in directing the 2006 Paris, and 2008 Helsinki and Santa Fe presentations of her second opera, Adriana Mater. As one review put it,

In the TV interview Saariaho named director Sellars as the hero of the performance. Aside from the bitter and violent war events, Sellars has added to the opera a dimension of hope that the conductor  herself had not envisaged in the first place.

In 2001, Sellars briefly directed South Australia's Adelaide Festival of Arts before being replaced by Sue Nattrass. Sellars' directorship remains the most controversial in the festival's history. He said the reason behind his shock departure was that he was "impeding the forward progress of the Festival".

The Opposition Arts Spokesperson for South Australia, the Hon. Carolyn Pickles, said:

The German soprano Elisabeth Schwarzkopf said of Sellars:

There are names I do not want mentioned in my home. Do not say that name in my presence. I have seen what he has done, and it is criminal. As my husband used to say, so far no one has dared go into the Louvre Museum to spray graffiti on the Mona Lisa, but some opera directors are spraying graffiti over masterpieces.The August 2019 Los Angeles Times piece on Sellars also focused on a production of Lohengrin directed by fellow MacArthur recipient Yuval Sharon. The article concluded by asking about the two American directors, "Can we go so far as to call this a Los Angeles school of opera? From this side of the Atlantic, that’s where the big ideas seem to be coming from."

References
Notes

Sources
 Favorini, Attilio. 2003. "History, Collective Memory, and Aeschylus' Persians." Theatre Journal 55:1 (March): 99–111.
 Meyer-Thoss, Gottfried, Extrakte. Peter Sellars – Amerikanisches Welttheater, Parthas Verlag Berlin, 2004

External links

1957 births
Living people
American theatre directors
Harvard University alumni
American opera directors
MacArthur Fellows
University of California faculty
Artists from Pittsburgh
Phillips Academy alumni